Thyrsostachys is a genus of Chinese and Indochinese bamboo in the grass family.

Species
 Thyrsostachys oliveri Gamble - edible-seeded bamboo - Yunnan, Myanmar, Laos, Thailand; naturalised in Assam + Bangladesh
 Thyrsostachys siamensis Gamble - monastery bamboo, Thai bamboo, umbrella bamboo, Thai umbrella bamboo, umbrella-handle bamboo - Yunnan, Myanmar, Laos, Thailand, Vietnam; naturalised in Sri Lanka, Bangladesh, Peninsular Malaysia

References

External links

Bambusoideae
Bambusoideae genera